Pavlikovo is a rural locality (a village) in Posyolok Krasnoye Ekho, Gus-Khrustalny District, Vladimir Oblast, Russia. The population was 36 as of 2010.

Geography 
Pavlikovo is located 32 km northeast of Gus-Khrustalny (the district's administrative centre) by road. Volnaya Artemovka is the nearest rural locality.

References 

Rural localities in Gus-Khrustalny District